Eide is a village in Hustadvika Municipality in Møre og Romsdal county, Norway, where it sits on the Romsdal Peninsula at the intersection of the Kornstadfjorden and Kvernesfjorden.

Eide Church, the main church for the municipality, is located in Eide.

The village served as the administrative centre of the old Eide Municipality until its dissolution in 2020.

References

Villages in Møre og Romsdal
Hustadvika (municipality)